Jiří Černický (born 1 August 1966, in Ústí nad Labem, Czechoslovakia) is a Czech visual artist who known for experimental intermedia projects involving video art, visual poetry and photography. He is a winner of the Jindřich Chalupecký Award, the Soros Award and the 48th October Salon Award (in Belgrade, Serbia), and was a finalist for the Alice Francis Award.

Career
Černický first studied art in Ústí nad Labem from 1987 to 1990, before moving to Prague in 1990 to attend the Academy of Arts, Architecture and Design, moving to the Academy of Fine Arts in 1993, where he studied until 1997.

He first received attention for outlandish projects, such as, in 1993, collecting tears from people in the street, which he then took to an Ethiopian monastery. His projects are varied, but usually depict hypothetical subjects. Černický combines various media in exhibitions, alternating between easel painting, objects, video and photography. He also uses action art and new media technologies. His work often features strong emotions, social commentary, and ironic humor. Other examples of Černický's works include tools for taking drugs made of cut glass, a tattooed sausage, a glass model of a nuclear explosion, a striped series of paintings, an ornamental series on terrorism, monochrome images with a silicon structure, a monument in the form of an information board at a railway station with philosophical texts, videos about the movement of the speed of light, the “Gagarin Thing”, and a white motorcycle helmet imitating Munch’s The Scream.

In 1998, Černický won the Jindřich Chalupecký Award. In 2015 he was appointed Associate Professor at the Faculty of Art and Design, Jan Evangelista Purkyně University in Ústí nad Labem.

Awards
 2007 - 48th October Salon Award, Beograd, Serbia
 1998 - The Jindřich Chalupecký Award, Prague
 1996 - The Soros Award, Prague
 2012 - Finalist of the Alice Francis Award

Exhibitions

Public Collections

 National Gallery, Prague, Czech Republic
 Prague City Gallery, Czech Republic
 Museum of Contemporary Art, Miami, USA
 Museum for Applied Art / Contemporary Art, Vienna, Austria
 Musee d’Art Moderne, Saint Etienne, France

Private Collections

 Richard Adam, Prague
 Pavel Kneppo, Prague
 Thomas Day Newbold, Prague, Washington, USA
 Bert-Jan van Egteren, Amsterdam, The Netherlands
 Santiago Eder, Amsterdam, The Netherlands
 Kenneth L. Freed, Boston, USA
 Habib Kheradyar, Los Angeles, USA
 Jerry Speyer, New York, USA

Exhibitions

 Galerie Rudolfinum, Prague, Czech Republic, "Jiří Černický: Wild Dreams" (2016).

Residencies
 Akademie der Künste, Berlin, Germany
 Tent Gallery and MAMA Gallery, Rotterdam, The Netherlands
 Headlands, San Francisco, USA
 Vivid Gallery, Birmingham, UK
 Spaces Gallery, Cleveland, USA
 Futura Gallery, Třebešice Castle, Czech Republic

Selected works

References

1966 births
Artists from Ústí nad Labem
21st-century Czech painters
21st-century male artists
Czech male sculptors
21st-century Czech sculptors
Living people
Czech male painters